The Fillmore City Cemetery, at 325 East 600 South in Fillmore, Utah, was started in 1852.  It was listed on the National Register of Historic Places in 2012.

It is a cemetery similar to that of 35 other Mormon villages compared in a study.

It was established when the Territorial Statehouse was under construction and the Utah Territorial Legislature was meeting in Fillmore.

Notable graves
 John Gunnison (1812–1853), leader of the ill-fated Gunnison–Beckwith expedition
 Amasa Mason Lyman (1813–1877), early Latter Day Saint movement church leader
 Proctor Robison (cenotaph), whose death at age 14 in 1857 was construed a cause for the Mountain Meadows Massacre

References

External links
 
 

Cemeteries in Utah
National Register of Historic Places in Millard County, Utah
Cemeteries on the National Register of Historic Places in Utah
Mormon cemeteries
1852 establishments in the United States